Bands on the Run is an American reality competition television series which first aired on VH1 from April 2 to July 15, 2001. The show featured four unsigned bands competing for a prize package which included $50,000 in cash, $100,000 in musical equipment from Guitar Center, a showcase in front of recording executives, and a fully produced music video to be aired on VH1. In the season finale, it was revealed that the band Flickerstick won the competition.

Bands

Format

Episodes

References

External links
Official Website
 

2000s American reality television series
VH1 original programming
2001 American television series debuts
2001 American television series endings